Catherine Nettleton  (born 13 March 1960) is a British diplomat who has been ambassador to Peru, ambassador to Venezuela, and UK Representative in Taiwan.

Career
Catherine Elizabeth Nettleton gained a BA degree from Exeter University and an MA from Manchester University. She worked for the Inland Revenue for a year before joining the Foreign and Commonwealth Office (FCO) in 1983. 
She learned Mandarin Chinese and served in British Embassy Beijing 1987–89 and also in 2000–03. She also served in British Embassy Mexico City and at the FCO. After six months at the Royal College of Defence Studies in 2004, she was Head of FCO Services (Presidencies) 2004–05 (at this time the UK held the presidencies of both the G8 and the EU). She was Ambassador to Peru 2006–10 and Ambassador to Venezuela 2010–14. In 2015 she became Director of Protocol at the FCO and deputy Marshal of the Diplomatic Corps. In 2016 she was appointed as the Representative at the British Office Taipei.

Honours
Nettleton was appointed Officer of the Order of the British Empire (OBE) in the 1999 Birthday Honours and Companion of the Order of St Michael and St George (CMG) in the 2015 New Year Honours.

References

1960 births
Living people
Alumni of the University of Exeter
Alumni of the University of Manchester
British women ambassadors
Members of HM Diplomatic Service
Ambassadors of the United Kingdom to Peru
Ambassadors of the United Kingdom to Venezuela
Representatives of the United Kingdom to Taiwan
Companions of the Order of St Michael and St George
Officers of the Order of the British Empire
20th-century British diplomats